The drill floor is the heart of any drilling rig. This is the area where the drill string begins its trip into the earth. It is traditionally where joints of pipe are assembled, as well as the BHA (bottom hole assembly), drilling bit, and various other tools. This is the primary work location for roughnecks and the driller. The drill floor is located directly under the derrick.

The floor is a relatively small work area in which the rig crew conducts operations, usually adding or removing drillpipe to or from the drillstring. The rig floor is the most dangerous location on the rig because heavy iron is moved around there. Drill string connections are made or broken on the drill floor, and the driller's console for controlling the major components of the rig are located there. Attached to the rig floor is a small metal room, the doghouse, where the rig crew can meet, take breaks and take refuge from the elements during idle times.

External links
 Schlumberger Oilfield Glossary
 The History of the Oil Industry 
 "Black Gold" Popular Mechanics, January 1930 - large photo article on oil drilling in the 1920s and 1930s
 "World's Deepest Well" Popular Science, August 1938, article on the late 1930s technology of drilling oil wells
 

Oilfield terminology
Oil platforms
Mining equipment